Nesopupa waianensis is a species of very small, air-breathing land snail, a terrestrial pulmonate gastropod mollusk in the family Vertiginidae, the whorl snails. This species is endemic to Hawaii in the United States.

References

Vertiginidae
Molluscs of Hawaii
Endemic fauna of Hawaii
Gastropods described in 1920
Taxonomy articles created by Polbot